Ring Hill is a village in the town of Litchfield, Maine, United States.

Geography of Kennebec County, Maine